The Private Collection is a live album by the American jazz bassist Charlie Haden's Quartet West recorded at performances in 1988 and 1989 and released on the Naim label.

Reception 

The Allmusic review by Scott Yanow stated, "Although one would not have necessarily predicted this direction for Charlie Haden's music in 1970, it has worked out quite well. This well-recorded two-fer features Haden's Quartet West at its best". All About Jazz observed "The Private Collection finds Haden and Quartet West at its true best, with material spanning four decades but still sounding, twenty years later, as if it had been written yesterday".

Track listing 
All compositions by Charlie Haden except as indicated

Disc One:
 "Hermitage"  (Pat Metheny) - 12:45   
 "Passport"  (Charlie Parker) - 15:34   
 "Misery" (Tony Scott) - 8:10   
 "Nardis" (Miles Davis) - 13:00   
 "Segment" (Parker) - 11:00   
 "Farmer's Trust" (Metheny) - 7:18   
 "Etudes" (Johann Sebastian Bach) - 3:30  
Recorded at Charlie Haden's 50th Birthday Concert at At My Place in Santa Monica, CA on August 6, 1987
 
Disc Two:
 "Bay City" - 13:28   
 "Farmer's Trust"  (Metheny) - 9:21   
 "Lonely Woman" (Ornette Coleman) - 22:51   
 "Silence" - 8:54   
 "Body and Soul" (Edward Heyman, Robert Sour, Frank Eyton, Johnny Green) - 8:20   
 "Visa" (Parker) - 12:16
Recorded at Webster University in St. Louis, MO on April 4, 1988

Personnel 
 Charlie Haden – bass
 Ernie Watts - saxophones
 Alan Broadbent - piano
 Billy Higgins (Disc One), Paul Motian (Disc Two) - drums

References 

Charlie Haden live albums
2007 live albums